Peter David Jones  (born 18 March 1966), also known as Mr. Global, is a British entrepreneur and reality television personality, with interests in mobile phones, television, media, leisure, retail, and property. He is the last remaining original investor on the BBC One show Dragons' Den and on the American television series American Inventor.

He was appointed Commander of the Order of the British Empire (CBE) in the 2009 New Year Honours. According to the Sunday Times Rich List in 2021, Jones was worth an estimated £1.157bn.

Early life 
Jones grew up in Langley, Buckinghamshire, before moving to Maidenhead when he was seven, and attended Desborough School and, subsequently, The Windsor Boys' School.

Career

Businesses 
Jones set up a business in which he made personal computers under his own brand when he was 16 years old. However, he lost £200,000 after deciding to sell it to IBM. In an interview with The Times, Jones said his computer business failed when he was in his twenties; he was forced to give up his three-bedroom home in Bray and his cars, and had to move back in with his parents. He then joined Siemens Nixdorf.

In his mid-twenties, he opened a cocktail bar in Windsor based on the Tom Cruise film Cocktail.

After Siemens' acquisition, he set up his next venture, Phones International Group, in April 1998.

In the summer of 2005, Jones, together with Theo Paphitis, a fellow panellist on Dragons' Den, bought gift experience company Red Letter Days from another panellist Rachel Elnaugh, under whose ownership it had collapsed.

Jones founded other businesses between 2004 and 2008, including Wines4Business.com, an online retailer specialising in the sale of wine and champagne to corporate clients, and Celsius Resourcing, a recruitment business specialising in biotechnologists.

In 2005, he founded The Peter Jones Foundation, a charity to support the advancement of education in young women, particularly through teachings of enterprise and entrepreneurship.

In 2009, Jones founded the Peter Jones Enterprise Academy (PJEA, formerly NEA) to teach entrepreneurial capabilities within the UK. PJEA has several campuses including Amersham, Sheffield, Manchester, Southend and Oxford. In November 2013, it was reported that a new Peter Jones Enterprise Academy was to be opened in Leamington through Warwickshire College. Pupils were to be taught how to enhance a company or key skills in becoming a successful entrepreneur. The academy was to offer the BTEC Level 3 Enterprise and Entrepreneurship at both its Leamington and Rugby campuses.

According to his website, some of his investments in businesses that have appeared on Dragons' Den include luxury lifestyle and culture Wonderland magazine; Square Mile International, which provides data services for marinas and was later sold to BT; contemporary circus company The Generating Company; Concentrate Design, which makes products claimed to help pupils concentrate at school; Synthetic Genomics; iTeddy; and Reggae Reggae Sauce.

He owns a TV production company, Peter Jones TV, and has several property investments; his properties include a Portuguese villa that he bought from DJ Chris Evans and a property in Beverly Hills, California.

Jones sold part of Phones International Group, Wireless Logic, for £38 million in 2011, retaining the Data Select part.

In 2013, Jones became the owner and chief executive of photographic retailer Jessops.

In August 2017, it was reported that Jones and his Dragon's Den and Red Letter Days partner Theo Paphitis were almost scammed by an accountant who forged cheques over a two-month period.

Television and media

Dragons' Den 
Jones is the sole remaining original Dragon on the BBC's Dragons' Den, which started in January 2005 and has continued with a new series approximately every year. Jones had regular conflicts in the Den with former Dragon Duncan Bannatyne, who appeared on the show from 2005 to 2014.

American Inventor 
He sold his television show idea called The Inventor to the American Broadcasting Company, resulting in American Inventor, which was co-produced by Fremantle, Simon Cowell and Peter Jones Television. Two series of the show were made, in 2006 and 2007.

Tycoon 
After signing a "golden handcuffs" deal with ITV to appear as their new "face" of business programming, on 21 September 2006 Jones appeared on GMTV to talk about Dragons' Den and his new ITV show Tycoon, produced by the Peter Jones Television company. The viewing figures were 2.1 million, which was more than the UK premiere of The Apprentice and Dragons' Den when they both broadcast in 2005. The series returned on Monday, 9 July 2007 as a 30-minute format for the 10 pm slot. Tycoon also inspired Tycoon in Schools, a nationwide youth enterprise competition which began in 2012 and  continues under the name Tycoon Enterprise Competition, supported by the Peter Jones Foundation.

Other television work 
In January 2010, Jones appeared alongside his Dragons' Den co-stars Duncan Bannatyne and Deborah Meaden in the fifth episode of the sixth series of Hustle. Jones appeared in ITV2's Celebrity Juice in May 2010, and James Corden's World Cup Live in June. In November 2010, Jones was a guest panellist in BBC quiz show Never Mind the Buzzcocks, and in The Magicians in January 2011. Jones has twice participated in the "Star in a Reasonably-Priced Car" segment of Top Gear, once on his own and once with fellow Dragons' Den judge Theo Paphitis.

Jones took over from Gordon Ramsay as the face of BT Business in 2008. Jones is also the Ambition Ambassador for the business software company Sage Group and appears in their television advertising as well as being a customer of the company.

Personal life 
Jones is separated from his first wife Caroline, with whom he had two children: Annabelle and William. He lives in Buckinghamshire with his partner, Tara, with whom he has three children.

He owns several classic and luxury sports cars. A keen amateur pipe organist, he achieved the grade 8 qualification when aged 18.

References

External links 

 
Dragons' Den Biography
 

People from Maidenhead
English businesspeople
English television personalities
Participants in American reality television series
Commanders of the Order of the British Empire
1966 births
Conservative Party (UK) donors
Living people